Sindh Muslim Government Arts & Commerce College simply S.M. Government  Arts & Commerce College ; is a government college located in Karachi, Pakistan. It was founded by the founder of Pakistan Muhammad Ali Jinnah in 1943.

The college holds morning and evening classes of intermediate level at its campuses. The college building is located near Dayaram Jethmal Science College.

Notable alumni
Waheed Murad (film producer and actor)
 Asad Muhammad Khan, Writer and poet

References 

Universities and colleges in Karachi
Educational institutions established in 1943
Public universities and colleges in Sindh
1943 establishments in India